In finance, intermarket analysis refers to the study of how "different sectors of the market move in relationships with other sectors." Technical analyst John J. Murphy pioneered this field.

References 

Stock market
Financial markets